is Pink Lady's 11th single. Peaking at number 4 on the Oricon charts, it was the duo's first single since "Pepper Keibu" in 1976 to not reach number 1. and number 2 on the Japanese Music Labo charts. The single sold over a million copies.

The title, Zipangu, refers to the accounts of Marco Polo on Japan.

The song was also featured on the Japanese music show The Best Ten, where it peaked at #7.

A re-recorded version of the song was included on the 2-disc greatest hits release, INNOVATION, released in December 2010.

Track listing (7" vinyl) 
All tracks composed by Shunichi Tokura, lyrics written by Yū Aku.

Chart positions

Cover versions
 Sue Cream Sue of Kome Kome Club recorded a cover version for the 2009 Pink Lady/Yū Aku tribute album Bad Friends.
 The tribute group Pink Babies covered the song in their "Nagisa no Sindbad" Type-A single in 2016.

References

External links
 
 

1979 singles
1979 songs
Pink Lady (band) songs
Japanese-language songs
Disco songs
Songs about Japan
Songs with lyrics by Yū Aku
Songs with music by Shunichi Tokura
Victor Entertainment singles